is a city located in Osaka Prefecture, Japan. , the city had an estimated population of 55,232 and a population density of 4,888 persons per km2.

Geography
Takaishi is located in the south-central part of Osaka Prefecture, bordered by Osaka Bay to the west. Almost the entire city area is flat and is completely urbanized. Roughly 6.1 kilometers east–west by1 kilometers north–south, it is the second smallest city in terms of area in Osaka prefecture after Fujiidera. The western half of the city is reclaimed land and is part of the Sakai Senboku Seaside Industrial Zone.

Neighboring municipalities
Osaka Prefecture
Sakai
Izumiōtsu
Izumi

Climate
Takaishi has a Humid subtropical climate (Köppen Cfa) characterized by warm summers and cool winters with light to no snowfall.  The average annual temperature in Takaishi is 14.7 °C. The average annual rainfall is 1475 mm with September as the wettest month. The temperatures are highest on average in August, at around 26.7 °C, and lowest in January, at around 3.4 °C.

Demographics
Per Japanese census data, the population of Takaishi almost doubled in the 1960s and peaked in the 1980s, and has been declining since.

History
The area of the modern city of Takaishi was within ancient Izumi Province, and the place name "Takaishi" appears in the Nara period Nihon Shoki and other ancient works. During the Edo Period, the area was largely under the control of Kishiwada Domain. The village of Takaishi was established within Ōtori District, Osaka, with the creation of the modern municipalities system on April 1, 1889.  On April 1, 1896, the area became part of Senboku District, Osaka. During the Russo-Japanese War, a large Prisoner-of-war camp was constructed on the coast of Takaishi, with an area of 430,000 square meters and a capacity to house 28,000 prisoners. The area is now a residential area.  Takaishi was promoted to town status on January 1, 1915. The neighboring village of Toriishi was annexed on April 1, 1953. Takaishi was promoted to city status on November 1, 1966. The city experienced a severe financial crisis in the late 1990s and the mayor at that time attempted to merge the city with Sakai. However, the merger became the major campaign issue in the following mayoral election, and was voted down in 2003 when the incumbent mayor lost in his bid for re-election.

Government
Takaishi has a mayor-council form of government with a directly elected mayor and a unicameral city council of 16 members. Takaishi collectively with the city of Izumiōtsu and the town of Tadaoka contributes two members to the Osaka Prefectural Assembly. In terms of national politics, the city is part of Osaka 18th district of the lower house of the Diet of Japan.

Economy
Takaishi is located in the Sakai Senboku Seaside Industrial Zone, with half the city area on reclaimed land on the coast of Osaka Bay. The economy is dominated by heavy industry, notably petroleum refineries, petrochemical and chemical plants.

Education
Takaishi has seven public elementary schools and three public middle schools operated by the city government and one public high school operated by the Osaka Prefectural Department of Education. The city also has two private middle schools and two private high schools. A private university, the Hagoromo International University is also located in Takaishi.

Transportation

Railway
 JR West – Hanwa Line
 

 Nankai Electric Railway -   Nankai Main Line
  - 
 Nankai Electric Railway -   Nankai Takashinohama Line
  -  -

Highway
  Bayshore Route

Sister city relations
 - Lomita, California, USA from October 1981

Local attractions
Takaishi Shrine
 Hamadera Park
Takaishi Danjiri Matsuri

References

External links

 Takaishi City official website 

Cities in Osaka Prefecture
Populated coastal places in Japan
Takaishi, Osaka